Brian Stuard (born December 10, 1982) is an American professional golfer, currently playing on the PGA Tour.

Born and raised in Jackson, Michigan, Stuard graduated from Napoleon High School in 2001. He played college golf at Oakland University in Rochester, Michigan, then in the Mid-Continent Conference, and earned a bachelor's degree in management in 2005.

Stuard turned professional in 2005 and played on the NGA Hooters Tour in 2006 and 2007. He has played on the Nationwide Tour since 2008. He finished tied for 19th at the 2009 PGA Tour Qualifying School to earn his PGA Tour card for 2010. On the PGA Tour in 2010, he played in 28 events and made 13 cuts. His best finish was a tie for second at the Mayakoba Golf Classic at Riviera Maya-Cancun. He finished 154th on the money list and returned to the Nationwide Tour in 2011.

Stuard regained his PGA Tour card after graduating from the Web.com Tour in 2012. 

In 2015, he finished 128th in the FedEx Cup points list, meaning that he would have only conditional status on Tour in 2016. However, he got his first career PGA Tour victory in May 2016 at the Zurich Classic of New Orleans, his 120th PGA Tour start, to regain full status until 2018. Stuard went bogey-free in the rain-shortened event. He also moved from 513th to 143rd in the world rankings.

Professional wins (1)

PGA Tour wins (1)

*Note: The 2016 Zurich Classic of New Orleans was shortened to 54 holes due to weather.

PGA Tour playoff record (1–0)

Results in major championships
Results not in chronological order in 2020.

CUT = missed the half-way cut
"T" = tied for place
NT = No tournament due to COVID-19 pandemic

Results in The Players Championship

CUT = missed the halfway cut
"T" indicates a tie for a place
C = Canceled after the first round due to the COVID-19 pandemic

Results in World Golf Championships

"T" = Tied

See also
2009 PGA Tour Qualifying School graduates
2012 Web.com Tour graduates
2022 Korn Ferry Tour Finals graduates

References

External links 

Brian Stuard ESPN Profile

American male golfers
PGA Tour golfers
Korn Ferry Tour graduates
Golfers from Michigan
Golfers from Florida
Oakland Golden Grizzlies athletes
Sportspeople from Jackson, Michigan
Sportspeople from Coral Springs, Florida
1982 births
Living people